Cha Hwa-yeon (born Cha Hak-kyung; January 25, 1960) is a South Korean actress.

Career
Cha made her acting debut in 1978, and became best known as the heroine Kim Mi-ja in the 1987 television drama Love and Ambition, a character who became an icon for modern Korean women in that era. But she retired a year later, after getting married in 1988. Cha returned to acting twenty years later in 2008 with Aeja's Older Sister, Minja.

In March 2018, Cha signed with new management agency Imagine Asia.

Filmography

Television series

Film

Variety show

Musical theatre

Awards and nominations

References

External links
 
 
 

1960 births
Living people
South Korean television actresses
South Korean film actresses
South Korean musical theatre actresses